A list of African film awards:

Africa International Film Festival
Africa Movie Academy Awards (AMAA)
Africa Magic Viewers' Choice Awards (AMVCA)
Best of Nollywood Awards
Botswana Independence Film Festival 
Cairo International Film Festival
Cameroon Academy Awards
Golden Movie Awards
Ghana Movie Awards
Golden Icons Academy Movie Awards
Kalasha Awards
Kenya Film & TV Awards
Marrakech International Film Festival
Namibian Theatre and Film Awards 
Nollywood and African Film Critics Awards
Nollywood Movies Awards
Riverwood Academy Awards
Rwanda International Movie Award (RIMA)
South African Film and Television Awards
Tanit d'or
Zambia Film, Television and Radio Awards (ZAFTAR)
Zanzibar International Film Festival
Zulu African Film Academy Awards (ZAFAA Global Awards)

African film awards
Film awards
African